Ernie Phillips may refer to:

Ernie Phillips (baseball), baseball player
Ernie Phillips (footballer) (1923–2004), English footballer